"Radio Song" is a song by American rock band R.E.M., released as the fourth single from their seventh album, Out of Time (1991), where it appears as the opening track. Lead singer Michael Stipe once said that he hoped everyone had enough sense of humor to realize that he was "kind of taking the piss of everyone," himself included. Stipe also asked KRS-One, leader of Boogie Down Productions (of which Stipe was a fan), to contribute to the track. He provides some backing vocals for the track, as well as a closing rap, and appears prominently in the video.

Critical reception
Parry Gettelman from Orlando Sentinel named the song one of the album's "strongest cuts", describing it as "an adventurous amalgam of jangly funk and sugary-sweet pop balladry, with KRS-1 a good foil for otherworldly singer Michael Stipe. While Stipe is, as usual, a bit oblique ("I've everything to show/I've everything to hide/ look into my eyes - listen"), KRS-1's words are unambiguous ("Now our children grow up prisoners/all their life - radio listeners")." Celia Farber from Spin felt it's one of the few "that rocks out a little [on the album], settling intermittently on a classic dramatic R.E.M. moment, with a crescendo of arpeggiated guitars and words about the world collapsing."

Track listing
All songs written by Bill Berry, Peter Buck, Mike Mills, and Michael Stipe unless otherwise indicated.

US/UK/Germany 7" / US/UK cassette
 "Radio Song" – 4:15
 "Love Is All Around" (Reg Presley) (live)1 – 3:15

UK "Collectors' Edition" CD
 "Radio Song" – 4:15
 "You Are the Everything" (live)3 – 4:43
 "Orange Crush" (live)² – 4:03
 "Belong" (live)4 – 4:47

US/Germany CD / US 12"/maxi-cassette
 "Radio Song (Tower of Luv Bug mix)" – 4:14
 "Love Is All Around" (Reg Presley) (live)1 – 3:15
 "Belong" (live)4 – 4:07

UK/Germany 12"
 "Radio Song" – 4:15
 "Love Is All Around" (Reg Presley) (live)1 – 3:15
 "Shiny Happy People (Music Mix)"

Notes
1 Recorded on Rockline, Los Angeles, California; April 1, 1991.
2 Incorrectly listed as "Fox Theater, Atlanta, Georgia; November 13, 1989"; actually from Miami Arena, Miami (FL), April 29, 1989.
3 Taken from the live performance video, Tourfilm.
4 Recorded at the Coliseum, Greensboro, North Carolina; November 10, 1989.

Details for the second and third live recordings (tracks three and four) for "Collectors' Edition" are not provided on the CD materials.

Charts

Personnel
R.E.M.
Bill Berry – drums
Peter Buck – guitar
Mike Mills – organ
Michael Stipe – lead vocals

Additional musicians
David Arenz – violin
Ellie Arenz – violin
Mark Bingham – string arrangement
David Braitberg – violin
Andrew Cox – cello
Reid Harris – viola
Peter Holsapple – bass guitar
Ralph Jones – double bass
Kidd Jordan – baritone, tenor and alto saxophone
Dave Kempers – violin
KRS-One – rapping
Scott Litt – echo-loop feed
Elizabeth Murphy – cello
Paul Murphy – lead viola

Use in other media 
The song was featured in the Cameron Crowe film Singles (1992), although it is not included in the official soundtrack album.

Bingo Hand Job version
A live version of "Radio Song" was released in early 2019 via Noisetrade. Recorded in 1991 at The Boderline in London, the track was credited to Bingo Hand Job, a pseudonym for R.E.M. and guests (who also adopted various fake names). A recording of the much bootlegged full concert was officially released in April 2019 as Live at the Borderline 1991.

References

External links
 Video clip at REMhq.com
 
 

R.E.M. songs
1991 singles
Songs written by Bill Berry
Songs written by Peter Buck
Songs written by Mike Mills
Songs written by Michael Stipe
Song recordings produced by Scott Litt
Song recordings produced by Michael Stipe
Song recordings produced by Mike Mills
Song recordings produced by Peter Buck
Song recordings produced by Bill Berry
Songs about music
Songs about radio
Warner Records singles
KRS-One songs
Rap rock songs